António Marquilhas (born 7 July 1933) is a Portuguese fencer. He competed in the individual and team sabre events at the 1960 Summer Olympics.

References

External links
 

1933 births
Living people
Portuguese male sabre fencers
Olympic fencers of Portugal
Fencers at the 1960 Summer Olympics